Fructan beta-fructosidase (exo-beta-D-fructosidase, exo-beta-fructosidase, polysaccharide beta-fructofuranosidase, fructan exohydrolase) is an enzyme with systematic name beta-D-fructan fructohydrolase. This enzyme catalyses the following chemical reaction

 Hydrolysis of terminal, non-reducing (2->1)- and (2->6)-linked beta-D-fructofuranose residues in fructans

Hydrolyses inulin and levan, and also sucrose.

References

External links 
 

EC 3.2.1